Holandia may refer to:

 Holandia, Pomeranian Voivodeship, a settlement in Poland
 Holandia, the Polish name of The Netherlands
 Anopinella holandia, a species of moth of the family Tortricidae

See also 

 Hollandia (disambiguation)
 Holand (disambiguation)